USS Hecla may refer to more than one United States Navy ship:

, a bomb brig purchased in 1846 and sold in 1848 after service in the Mexican War
, a never-completed monitor originally named Shakamaxon and later renamed Nebraska, scrapped incomplete in 1875

United States Navy ship names